The Baker rules refer to a set of negotiation process principles identifying who the parties to the Nagorno-Karabakh conflict are. Armenia and Republic of Azerbaijan are identified as the principal parties and Armenian community and Azerbaijani community of Karabakh are identified as interested parties.

The Baker rules were named after the 61st US Secretary of State James Baker III, who was appointed US top negotiator within CSCE mediation efforts to end Nagorno-Karabakh conflict. The rules on how the parties to the conflict were going to be represented during CSCE sponsored negotiations were agreed by foreign ministers of Azerbaijan and Armenia. Since the inception, Baker rules has been the core basis within the negotiation process mediated by OSCE Minsk Group.

See also
Madrid Principles
Bishkek Protocol
Tehran Communiqué
Zheleznovodsk Communiqué

References

First Nagorno-Karabakh War
Negotiation
Proposed treaties
Multilateral relations
History of Madrid
Treaties of Armenia
Treaties of Azerbaijan
Treaties concluded in 1992
Organization for Security and Co-operation in Europe
History of the foreign relations of the United States
1992 in the Nagorno-Karabakh Republic